Denial (Greek: Άρνηση) is a poem by Giorgos Seferis (1900–1971) published in his collection Turning Point (Στροφή "Strophe") in 1931.  After the coup that overthrew the Greek government in 1967, Seferis went into voluntary seclusion and many of his poems were banned, including the musical versions which Mikis Theodorakis had written and arranged.  Denial came to be the anthem of resistance to the regime and was sung by the enormous crowds lining the streets at Seferis' funeral.

Sources
George Seferis, Edmund Keeley, Philip Sherrard (Editor) -- (Paperback - 3 July, 1995) 
George Seferis: Complete Poems George Seferis, Edmund Keeley (Translator), Philip Sherrard (Translator) 
A Poet's Journal: Days of 1945-1951, George Seferis, Athanasios Anagnostopoulos (Translator) 1583485341

1931 poems
Greek poems
Generation of the '30s